Berlin Heidelberger Platz is a railway station in the Wilmersdorf district of Berlin.

The station on the Berlin Ringbahn was opened with the name "Schmargendorf" on 15 December 1883. In 1980 the S-Bahn service was discontinued and the former entrance hall eventually became a nightclub. On 17 December 1993 the S-Bahn station was reopened, now directly connected to the adjacent U-Bahn station and therefore renamed Heidelberger Platz.

The U-Bahn station opened on 12 October 1913 (architect Wilhelm Leitgebel). With its high groin vault it is one of the most brightly decorated of the Berlin network. The eponymous square was named after the city of Heidelberg.

References

Berlin S-Bahn stations
U3 (Berlin U-Bahn) stations
Buildings and structures in Charlottenburg-Wilmersdorf
Berlin Heidelberger Platz